The following is a list of clubs who have played in the A-League Men since its formation in 2005 as the A-League to the current season.

Twelve of the fifteen clubs to have participated in the A-League Men are competing in the 2021-22 season. Seven (Adelaide United, Brisbane Roar, Central Coast Mariners, Melbourne Victory, Newcastle Jets, Perth Glory and Sydney FC) have contested every season in the A-League Men.

Five clubs, Macarthur FC, Melbourne City, Wellington Phoenix, Western Sydney Wanderers and Western United are not founding members of the A-League Men, but have not been disbanded since their debuts.

Table
All statistics here refer to time in the A-League Men only. A-League Men teams playing in the 2022–23 season are indicated in bold, while founding members of the A-League Men are shown in italics.

As of the 2007–08 season, New Zealand Knights were disbanded from the A-League, as they were replaced by the Wellington Phoenix.

In 2009, the A-League marked the addition of two new teams both from Queensland which was the Gold Coast United and North Queensland Fury who made their debuts for the 2009–10 season.

In late 2009 Sydney Rovers FC were awarded the license rights to join the A-League provisionally for the 2011-12 season, which would have made them the 11th team in the league, with a 12th team license to be awarded at a later date to even the numbers of participants. One year later the Rovers license was withdrawn due to financial concerns. 

The North Queensland Fury only lasted two seasons in the A-League and Gold Coast United lasted three. In Gold Coast's third and final season, new Melbourne club, Melbourne Heart joined the league which brought the total number of teams to 11. In 2012 Gold Coast United were disbanded after low crowds from the A-League and Clive Palmer withdrawing his funding from the team after clashing with the FFA.

A new Sydney team Western Sydney Wanderers joined the league.

The number of teams in the A-League stayed the same for six years until it was announced that Western United will play in the A-League in 2019 with Macarthur FC joining in 2020.

Chart

Timeline

Location of all A-League Men clubs

References
General
 

Specific

A-League Men lists
A-League Men teams